This is a list of media serving Rochester, New York and its surrounding area.

Print media

Daily newspapers 

Democrat and Chronicle, Rochester's main daily newspaper, published since 1833
Insider magazine (owned by the Democrat and Chronicle)
The Daily Record – legal, real estate, and business daily, has published Monday through Friday since 1908

Weekly and monthly publications 

City Newspaper – free, weekly publication published since 1972
Genesee Valley Penny Saver – free, weekly magazine
Rochester Business Journal – weekly business paper
The Monroe County Post – has different publications serving different parts of the Rochester area
The Good Life Magazine –  free bi-monthly publication
Rochester Indymedia – grassroots, democratically run Independent Media Center
Minority Reporter – free, weekly African-American newspaper
La Voz – an associated monthly, bilingual newspaper for the area's Hispanic population
The Empty Closet – free monthly LGBT magazine that has been published since 1971, making it the oldest LGBT publication in New York and one of the oldest in the United States
The Catholic Courier – circulated by the Roman Catholic Diocese of Rochester since 1889
The Jewish Ledger – weekly newspaper serving the Rochester area's Jewish community since 1924

Student publications 

The Campus Times (University of Rochester)
The Monroe Doctrine (Monroe Community College)
The Reporter (Rochester Institute of Technology)

Defunct newspapers
Frederick Douglass' abolitionist newspaper The North Star was published in Rochester from 1847 to 1851 and merged with Gerrit Smith's Liberty Party Paper (based in Syracuse, New York) to form Frederick Douglass' Paper, which was published until 1860.

Rochester was served by the Rochester Post Express published by the Post Express Print Company from 1882 to 1923. In 1923 the paper merged with the Rochester News Corporation's Rochester Evening Journal to become Rochester Evening Journal and The Post Express and served the area from 1923 through 1937. Rochester's evening paper for many years was the Times-Union, which merged operations with the Democrat and Chronicle in 1992, going defunct five years later.

New Women's Times (1975–1985) was a radical feminist newspaper that had reached a national readership by end of its publication. In 1981, it had a circulation of 25,000.

Freetime (1987–2016) was a free, weekly entertainment magazine.

About... time (1972–2002) was an African-American magazine.

The Rochester Patriot, 23 times a year from around 1972 until 1982.

Television

Rochester is served by eight broadcast television stations:
CBS: WROC-TV 8 (cable 8)
NBC: WHEC-TV 10 (cable 10)
ABC: WHAM 13 (cable 13)
PBS: WXXI-TV 21 (cable 11)
Fox: WUHF 31 (cable 7)
MyNetworkTV: WBGT-CD 46 (cable 18)
CW: WHAM-DT2 (13–2) (cable 16)
Rochester Community TV (RCTV cable 15)

Cable
Charter Communications provides Rochester with cable-fed internet service, digital and standard cable television, and Spectrum News 1 Rochester, a 24-hour local news channel.

Radio
Rochester is served by several AM and FM radio stations including:
WXXI and WXXI-FM (Public Radio; AM News and Talk, FM Classical and Fine Arts)
WCMF-FM (Rock and Roll)
WBEE-FM (Country)
WBZA (Adult hits)
WPXY-FM (Contemporary hit radio)
WLGZ-FM (Classic hits)
WROC (Sports/CBS Sports Radio/BetQL Network)
WHTK (Sports/Fox Sports Radio)
WRMM-FM (Adult contemporary)
WDKX (Urban contemporary radio)
WGMC (Jazz)
WITR (independent and local)
WBER (alternative, independent, and local)
WRUR-FM (adult album alternative)
WZNE (modern rock)
WZXV (Christian radio)
WRSB (Spanish contemporary radio)
WHAM (news and talk).

References

Rochester, NY